The foibe massacres, or simply the foibe, refers to mass killings both during and after World War II, mainly committed by Yugoslav Partisans and OZNA in the then-Italian territories of Julian March (Karst Region and Istria), Kvarner and Dalmatia, against the local ethnic Italian population (Istrian Italians and Dalmatian Italians), as well the ethnic Slovenes, Croats and Istro-Romanians who chose to maintain Italian citizenship, against all anti-communists, associated with fascism, Nazism, and collaboration with the Axis powers, and against real, potential or presumed opponents of Titoism. The type of attack was state terrorism, reprisal killings, while ethnic cleansing against Italians is still disputed.

The Yugoslav partisans intended to kill whoever could oppose or compromise the future annexation of Italian territories: as a preventive purge of real, potential or presumed opponents of Titoism (Italian, Slovenian and Croatian anti-communists, collaborators, and radical nationalists), the Yugoslav partisans exterminated the native anti-fascist autonomists — including the leadership of Italian anti-fascist partisan organizations and the leaders of Fiume's Autonomist Party, like Mario Blasich and Nevio Skull, who supported local independence from both Italy and Yugoslavia — for example in the city of Fiume, where at least 650 were killed after the entry of the Yugoslav units, without any due trial.

The term refers to the victims who were often thrown alive into foibe, or into deep natural sinkholes characteristic of the karst regions (by extension, it also was applied to the use of mine shafts, etc., to hide the bodies). In a wider or symbolic sense, some authors used the term to apply to all disappearances or killings of Italian people in the territories occupied by Yugoslav forces. They excluded possible 'foibe' killings by other parties or forces. Others included deaths resulting from the forced deportation of Italians, or those who died while trying to flee from these contested lands.

The foibe massacres were followed by the Istrian–Dalmatian exodus, which was the post-World War II exodus and departure of local ethnic Italians (Istrian Italians and Dalmatian Italians) from the Yugoslav territory of Istria, Kvarner, the Julian March, lost by Italy after the Treaty of Paris (1947), as well as Dalmatia, towards Italy, and in smaller numbers, towards the Americas, Australia and South Africa. According to various sources, the exodus is estimated to have amounted to between 230,000 and 350,000 Italians (the others being ethnic Slovenes, Croats, and Istro-Romanians, who chose to maintain Italian citizenship) leaving the areas in the aftermath of the conflict.

The estimated number of people killed in the foibe is disputed, varying from hundreds to thousands, according to some sources 11,000 or 20,000. The Italian historian, Raoul Pupo estimates 3,000 to 4,000 total victims, across all areas of former Yugoslavia and Italy from 1943 to 1945, with the primary target being military and repressive forces of the Fascist regime, and civilians associated with the regime, including Slavic collaborators. He places the events in the broader context of "the collapse of a structure of power and oppression: that of the fascist state in 1943, that of the Nazi-fascist state of the Adriatic coast in 1945."

The events were also part of larger reprisals in which tens-of-thousands of Slavic collaborators of Axis forces were killed in the aftermath of WWII, following a brutal war in which some 800,000 Yugoslavs, the vast majority civilians, were killed by Axis occupation forces and collaborators, with Italian forces committing war crimes. Similar postwar reprisals occurred in other countries, including Italy, where the Italian resistance and others killed an estimated 12,000 to 26,000 Italians, usually in extra-judicial executions, the great majority in Northern Italy, just in April and May 1945.

Origin and meaning of the term 

The name was derived from a local geological feature, a type of deep karst sinkhole called foiba. The term includes by extension killings and "burials" in other subterranean formations, such as the Basovizza "foiba", which is a mine shaft.

In Italy the term foibe has, for some authors and scholars, taken on a symbolic meaning; for them it refers in a broader sense to all the disappearances or killings of Italian people in the territories occupied by Yugoslav forces. According to author :
It is well known that the majority of the victims didn't end their lives in a Karst cave, but met their deaths on the road to deportation, as well as in jails or in Yugoslav concentration camps.

Pupo also states that — since the primary targets of the purges were ideological, i.e. the anti-communists — the Yugoslav troops did not behave like an occupying army, partly contradicting the numerous academic authors and institutional figures — both in Italy and abroad — who recognized an ethnic cleansing against Italians, and against ethnic Slovenes, Croats and Istro-Romanians who chose to maintain Italian citizenship.

The terror spread by these disappearances and killings eventually caused the majority of the Italians of Istria, Fiume, and Zara to flee to other parts of Italy or the Free Territory of Trieste. Raoul Pupo wrote: 

According to Fogar and Miccoli there is the need to put the episodes in 1943 and 1945 within [the context of] a longer history of abuse and violence, which began with Fascism and with its policy of oppression of the minority Slovenes and Croats and continued with the Italian aggression on Yugoslavia, which culminated with the horrors of the Nazi-Fascist repression against the Partisan movement.
Other authors assert that the post-war pursuit of the 'truth' of the foibe, as a means of transcending Fascist/Anti-Fascist oppositions and promoting popular patriotism, has not been the preserve of right-wing or neo-Fascist groups. Evocations of the 'Slav other' and of the terrors of the foibe made by state institutions, academics, amateur historians, journalists, and the memorial landscape of everyday life were the backdrop to the post-war renegotiation of Italian national identity.

Gaia Baracetti notes that Italian representations of foibe, such as a miniseries on national television, are replete with historical inaccuracies and stereotypes, portraying Slavs as “merciless assassins”, similar to fascist propaganda, while “largely ignoring the issue of Italian war crimes” Others, including members of Italy's Jewish community, have objected to Italian right-wing efforts to equate the foibe with the Holocaust, via historical distortions which include exaggerated foibe victim claims, in an attempt to turn Italy from a perpetrator in the Holocaust, to a victim.

Events 
The first (disputed) claims of people being thrown into foibe date to 1943, after the Wehrmacht took back the area from the Partisans. Other authors claimed the 70 hostages were killed and burned in the Nazi lager of the Risiera of San Sabba, on 4 April 1944.

The massacres occurred in two waves, the first taking places in the interlude between the Armistice of Cassibile and the German occupation of Istria in September 1943, and the second after the Yugoslav occupation of the region in May 1945. Victims of the first wave numbered in the hundreds, whereas those of the second wave in the thousands. The first wave of killings is widely regarded as a disorganized, spontaneous series of revenge killings by Slovenes and Croats after twenty years of Fascist oppression, as well as "jacquerie" against Italian landowners and more broadly the Italian elite in the region; these killings targeted members of the Fascist Party, their relatives (as in the famous case of Norma Cossetto), Italian landowners, policemen and civil servants of all ranks, considered as symbols of Italian oppression. The scope and nature of the second wave is much more disputed; Slovene and Croat historians, as well as Communist-leaning Italian historians such as Alessandra Kersevan and Claudia Cernigoi, characterize it as another wave of revenge killings against Fascist collaborators and members of the armed forces of the Italian Social Republic, whereas Italian historians such as Raoul Pupo, Gianni Oliva and Roberto Spazzali argue that this was the result of a deliberate Titoist policy aimed at spreading terror among the Italian population of the region and eliminating anyone who opposed Yugoslav plans of annexing Istria and the Julian March, including anti-Fascists. It is to be noted that while the foibe became the symbol of these massacres, only a minority of the victims were killed with this method, largely during the first wave; a far larger part were executed and buried in mass graves or died in Yugoslav prisons and concentration camps.

After the re-occupation of Istria by Axis forces in September 1943, following the first wave of killings, the fire brigade of Pola, under the command of Arnaldo Harzarich, recovered 204 bodies from the foibe of the region. Between 1945 and 1948, Italian authorities recovered a total 369 corpses from foibe in the Italian-controlled part of the Free Territory of Trieste (Zone A), and another 95 were recovered from mass graves in the same area; these included also bodies of German soldiers killed in the closing days of the war and hastily buried in these cavities. Foibe located in the Yugoslav-controlled part of the Free Territory of Trieste, as well as in the rest of Istria, were never searched as this territory was now under Yugolav control.

Great controversy has surrounded the foiba of Basovizza, one of the most famous foibe (and unlikely called as such, as it was not a natural foiba but a disused mine shaft). Newspaper reports from the postwar era claimed anywhere from 18 to 3,000 victims in this foiba alone, but Trieste authorities refused to fully excavate it, citing financial constraints. At the end of the war, local villagers had thrown the bodies of dead German soldiers (killed in a battle fought in the vicinity in the closing days of the war) and horses into the mine shaft, which after the war had also been used as a garbage dump by the authorities of the Free Territory of Trieste. After the war the Basovizza foibe was used by the Italian authorities as a garbage dump. Thus no Italian victims were ever recovered or determined at Basovizza. In 1959 the pit was sealed and a monument erected, which later became the central site for the annual foibe commemorations.

At the Plutone foibe near Bazovizza, members of the Trieste Steffe criminal gang killed 18 people. For this the leader of the gang, Giovanni Steffe, and three others were arrested by the Yugoslav forces. Steffe and Carlo Mazzoni were killed by the Yugoslav forces while trying to escape. Three members of the gang, all from Trieste, were later convicted by Italian courts to 2 to 5 years in jail for the killings. Altogether some 70 trials were held in Italy from 1946 to 1949 for the killings, some ending in acquittals or amnesties, others with heavy sentences.

In 1947, British envoy W. J. Sullivan wrote of Italians arrested and deported by Yugoslav forces from around Trieste:  Alongside a large number of Fascists, however, among those killed were also anti-Fascists who opposed the Yugoslav annexation of the region, such as Socialist Licurgo Olivi and Action Party leader Augusto Sverzutti, members of the Committee of National Liberation of Gorizia; in Trieste, the same fate befell Resistance leaders Romano Meneghello (posthumously awarded a Silver Medal of Military Valor for his Resistance activities) and Carlo Dell'Antonio. In Fiume (where at least 652 Italians were killed or disappeared between 3 May 1945 and 31 December 1947, according to a joint Italian-Croat study), Autonomist Party leaders Mario Blasich, Joseph Sincich and Nevio Skull were among those executed by the Yugoslavs soon after the occupation, as was anti-Fascist and Dachau survivor Angelo Adam. Priests were also targeted by the new Yugoslav Communist authorities, as in the case of Francesco Bonifacio. Out of 1,048 people who were arrested and executed by the Yugoslavs in the province of Gorizia in May 1945, according to a list drafted by a joint Italian-Slovene commission in 2006, 470 were members of the military or police forces of the Italian Social Republic, 110 were Slovene civilians accused of collaborationism, and 320 were Italian civilians.

The foibe massacres were state terrorism, reprisal killings, and ethnic cleansing against Italians. The foibe massacres were mainly committed by Yugoslav Partisans and OZNA against the local ethnic Italian population (Istrian Italians and Dalmatian Italians), as well against anti-communists in general (even Croats and Slovenes), usually associated with Fascism, Nazism and collaboration with Axis, and against real, potential or presumed opponents of Tito communism. The events were also part of larger reprisals in which tens-of-thousands of Slavic collaborators of Axis forces were killed in the aftermath of WWII, following a brutal war in which some 800,000 Yugoslavs, the vast majority civilians, were killed by Axis occupation forces and collaborators.

The foibe massacres were followed by the Istrian–Dalmatian exodus, which was the post-World War II expulsion and departure of local ethnic Italians (Istrian Italians and Dalmatian Italians) from the Yugoslav territory of Istria, Kvarner, the Julian March, lost by Italy after the Treaty of Paris (1947), as well as Dalmatia, towards Italy, and in smaller numbers, towards the Americas, Australia and South Africa. According to various sources, the exodus is estimated to have amounted to between 230,000 and 350,000 Italians (the others being ethnic Slovenes, Croats, and Istro-Romanians, who chose to maintain Italian citizenship) leaving the areas in the aftermath of the conflict. From 1947, after the war, Italians were subject by Yugoslav authorities to less violent forms of intimidation, such as nationalization, expropriation, and discriminatory taxation, which gave them little option other than emigration. According to the census organized in Croatia in 2001 and that organized in Slovenia in 2002, the Italians who remained in the former Yugoslavia amounted to 21,894 people (2,258 in Slovenia and 19,636 in Croatia).

Number of victims

The number of those killed or left in foibe during and after the war is still unknown; it is difficult to establish and a matter of controversy. Estimates range from hundreds to twenty thousand. According to data gathered by a joint Slovene-Italian historical commission established in 1993, "the violence was further manifested in hundreds of summary executions - victims were mostly thrown into the Karst chasms (foibe) - and in the deportation of a great number of soldiers and civilians, who either wasted away or were killed during the deportation".

Historians Raoul Pupo and Roberto Spazzali, have estimated the total number of victims at about 5,000, and note that the targets were not "Italians", but military and repressive forces of the Fascist regime, and civilians associated with the regime. More recently, Pupo has revised the total victims estimates to 3,000 to 4,000. Italian historian Guido Rumici estimated the number of Italians executed, or died in Yugoslav concentration camps, as between 6,000 and 11,000, while Mario Pacor estimated that after the armistice about 400-500 people were killed in the foibe and about 4,000 were deported, many of whom were later executed. Other sources claim 20,000 victims.

It was not possible to extract all the corpses from the foibe, some of which are deeper than several hundred meters; some sources are attempting to compile lists of locations and possible victim numbers. Between October and December 1943, the fire brigade of Pola, helped by mine workers, recovered a total of 159 victims of the first wave of mass killings from the foibe of Vines (84 bodies), Terli (26 bodies), Treghelizza (2 bodies), Pucicchi (11 bodies), Villa Surani (26 bodies), Cregli (8 bodies) and Carnizza d'Arsia (2 bodies); another 44 corpses were recovered in the same period from two bauxite mines in Lindaro and Villa Bassotti. More bodies were sighted, but not recovered.

The most famous Basovizza foiba, was investigated by English and American forces, starting immediately on June 12, 1945. After 5 months of investigation and digging, all they found in the foiba were the remains of 150 German soldiers and one civilian killed in the final battles for Basovizza on April 29–30, 1945. The Italian mayor, Gianni Bartoli continued with investigations and digging until 1954, with speleologists entering the cave multiple time, yet they found nothing. Between November 1945 and April 1948, firefighters, speleologists and policemen inspected foibe and mine shafts in the "Zone A" of the Free Territory of Trieste (mainly consisting in the surroundings of Trieste), where they recovered 369 corpses; another 95 were recovered from mass graves in the same area. At the time, no inspections were carried out either in the Yugoslav-controlled "Zone B", or in the rest of Istria.

Other foibe and mass graves were investigated in more recently in Istria and elsewhere in Slovenia and Croatia; for instance, human remains were discovered in the Idrijski Log foiba near Idrija, Slovenia, in 1998; four skeletons were found in the foiba of Plahuti near Opatija in 2002; in the same year, a mass grave containing the remains of 52 Italians and 15 Germans, most likely all military, was discovered in Slovenia, not far from Gorizia; in 2005, the remains of about 130 people killed between the 1940s and the 1950s were recovered from four foibe located in northeastern Istria.

Background

Early history
Via conquests, the Republic of Venice, between the 9th century and 1797, extended its dominion to coastal parts of Istria and Dalmatia. Thus Venice invaded and attacked Zadar multiple times, especially devastating the city in 1202 when Venice used the crusaders, on their Fourth Crusade, to lay siege, then ransack, demolish and rob the city, the population fleeing into countryside. Pope Innocent III excommunicated the Venetians and crusaders for attacking a Catholic city. The Venetians used the same Crusade to attack the Dubrovnik Republic, and force it to pay tribute, then continued to sack Christian Orthodox Constantinople where they looted, terrorized, and vandalized the city, killing 2.000 civilians, raping nuns and destroying Christian Churches, with Venice receiving a big portion of the plundered treasures. 

The coastal areas and cities of Istria came under Venetian Influence in the 9th century. In 1145, the cities of Pula, Koper and Izola rose against the Republic of Venice but were defeated, and were since further controlled by Venice. On 15 February 1267, Poreč was formally incorporated with the Venetian state. Other coastal towns followed shortly thereafter. The Republic of Venice gradually dominated the whole coastal area of western Istria and the area to Plomin on the eastern part of the peninsula. Dalmatia was first and finally sold to the Republic of Venice in 1409 but Venetian Dalmatia wasn't fully consolidated from 1420.

From the Early Middle Ages onwards numbers of Slavic people near and on the Adriatic coast were ever increasing, due to their expanding population and due to pressure from the Ottomans pushing them from the south and east. This led to Italic people becoming ever more confined to urban areas, while the countryside was populated by Slavs, with certain isolated exceptions. In particular, the population was divided into urban-coastal communities (mainly Romance speakers) and rural communities (mainly Slavic speakers), with small minorities of Morlachs and Istro-Romanians.

Republic of Venice influenced the neolatins of Istria and Dalmatia until 1797, when it was conquered by Napoleon: Koper and Pula were important centers of art and culture during the Italian Renaissance. From the Middle Ages to the 19th century, Italian and Slavic communities in Istria and Dalmatia had lived peacefully side by side because they did not know the national identification, given that they generically defined themselves as "Istrians" and "Dalmatians", of "Romance" or "Slavic" culture.

Austrian Empire

The French victory of 1809 compelled Austria to cede a portion of its South Slav lands to France, Napoleon combined Carniola, western Carinthia, Gorica (Gorizia), Istria, and parts of Croatia, Dalmatia, and Dubrovnik to form the Illyrian Provinces. The Code Napoléon was introduced, and roads and schools were constructed. Local citizens were given administrative posts, and native languages were used to conduct official business. This sparked the Illyrian Movement for the cultural and linguistic unification of South Slavic lands.

After the fall of Napoleon (1814), Istria, Kvarner and Dalmatia were annexed to the Austrian Empire. Many Istrian Italians and Dalmatian Italians looked with sympathy towards the Risorgimento movement that fought for the unification of Italy. However, after the Third Italian War of Independence (1866), when the Veneto and Friuli regions were ceded by the Austrians to the newly formed Kingdom Italy, Istria and Dalmatia remained part of the Austro-Hungarian Empire, together with other Italian-speaking areas on the eastern Adriatic. This triggered the gradual rise of Italian irredentism among many Italians in Istria, Kvarner and Dalmatia, who demanded the unification of the Julian March, Kvarner and Dalmatia with Italy. The Italians in Istria, Kvarner and Dalmatia supported the Italian Risorgimento: as a consequence, the Austrians saw the Italians as enemies and favored the Slav communities of Istria, Kvarner and Dalmatia, 

During the meeting of the Council of Ministers of 12 November 1866, Emperor Franz Joseph I of Austria outlined a wide-ranging project aimed at the Germanization or Slavization of the areas of the empire with an Italian presence:

Istrian Italians were more than 50% of the total population for centuries, while making up about a third of the population in 1900. Dalmatia, especially its maritime cities, once had a substantial local ethnic Italian population (Dalmatian Italians), making up 33% of the total population of Dalmatia in 1803, but this was reduced to 20% in 1816. In the 1910 Austro-Hungarian census, Istria had a population of 57.8% Slavic-speakers (Croat and Slovene), and 38.1% Italian speakers. For the Austrian Kingdom of Dalmatia, (i.e. Dalmatia), the 1910 numbers were 96.2% Slavic speakers and 2.8% Italian speakers, compared to 12.5% Italian speakers in the first Austro-Hungarian census of 1865. Many of these Italian speakers were local Slavs who became Italianized due to Italian long being the only official language, and later returned to Slavic languages. In 1909 the Italian language lost its status as the official language of Dalmatia in favor of Croatian only (previously both languages were recognized): thus Italian could no longer be used in the public and administrative sphere.

Historians note that while Slavs made up 80-95% of the Dalmatia populace, only Italian language schools existed until 1848, and due to restrictive voting laws, which allowed only wealthy property owners to vote, the Italian-speaking aristocratic minority retained political control of Dalmatia. They fought to keep Italian as the only official language, and opposed granting official languages rights to the Croatian language, spoken by the great majority of inhabitants. Only after Austria liberalized elections in 1870, allowing more majority Slavs to vote, did Croatian parties gain control. Croatian finally became an official language in Dalmatia in 1883, along with Italian. Yet minority Italian-speakers continued to wield strong influence, since Austria favored Italians for government work, thus in the Austrian capital of Dalmatia, Zara, the proportion of Italians continued to grow, making it the only Dalmatian city with an Italian majority.

When Italy took over the Veneto region, it sought to repress the language of the local Slovene minority. In 1911, complaining of local Italian efforts to falsely count Slovenes as Italians, the Trieste Slovene newspaper Edinost wrote: “We are here, we want to stay here and enjoy our rights! We throw the ruling clique the glove a duel, and we will not give up until artificial Trieste Italianism is crushed in dust, lying under our feet.” Due to these complaints, Austria carried a census recount, and the number of Slovenes increased by 50-60% in Trieste and Gorizia, proving Slovenes were initially falsely counted as Italians.

After World War I 
Although a member of the Central Powers, Italy remained neutral at the start of WWI, and soon launched secret negotiations with the Triple Entente, bargaining to participate in the war on its side, in exchange for significant territorial gains. To get Italy to join the war, in the secret 1915 Treaty of London the Entente promised Italy Istria and parts of Dalmatia, German-speaking South Tyrol, the Greek Dodecanese Islands, parts of Albania and Turkey, plus more territory for Italy's North Africa colonies.

After World War I, the whole of the former Austrian Julian March, including Istria, and Zadar in Dalmatia were annexed by Italy, while Dalmatia (except Zadar) was annexed by the Kingdom of Yugoslavia. Contrary to the Treaty of London, in 1919 Gabrielle D’Annunzio led an army of 2,600 Italian war veterans to seize the city of Fiume (Rijeka). D’Annunzio created the Italian Regency of Carnaro, with him as its dictator, or Comandante, and a constitution foreshadowing the Fascist system. After D’Annuzio's removal, Fiume briefly become a Free State, but local Fascists in 1922 carried out a coup, and in 1924 Italy annexed Fiume.

As a result, 480,000 Slavic-speakers came under Italian rule, while 12,000 Italian speakers were left in Yugoslavia, mostly in Dalmatia. Italy began a policy of forced Italianization. which intensified under Fascist rule from 1922 to 1943. Italy forbade Slavic languages in public institutions and schools, moved 500 Slovene teachers to the interior of Italy, replacing them with Italian ones. All Slavic newspapers and publications were banned, while Slavic libraries were closed. The Italian government forcefully changed people’s names to Italian ones. All Slavic cultural, sporting, professional, business and political associations were likewise banned; minorities in Italy were left without any representation. Slavs were restricted from public sector empolyment. As a result, 100,000 Slavic speakers left Italian-annexed areas in an exodus, moving mostly to Yugoslavia. In Fiume alone, the Slavic population declined by 66% by 1925, compared to pre-WWI levels. The remnants of the Italian community in Dalmatia (which had started a slow but steady emigration to Istria and Venice during the 19th century) left their cities toward Zadar and the Italian mainland.

During the early 1920s, nationalistic violence was directed both against the Slovene and Croat minorities in Istria (by Italian nationalists and Fascists) and the Italian minority in Dalmatia (by Slovene and Croat nationalists). In Dalmatia hostilities arose when in 1918 Italy occupied by force several cities, like Šibenik, with large majority Slav populations, while armed Italian nationalist irregulars commanded by Dalmatian Italian Count Fanfogna proceeded further south to Split. This led to the 1918–20 unrest in Split, when members of the Italian minority and their properties were assaulted by Croatian nationalists (and two Italian Navy personnel and a Croatian civilian were later killed during riots). In 1920  Italian nationalists and fascists burned the Trieste National Hall, the main center of the Slovene minority in Trieste. During D’Annunzio’s armed 1919-1920 occupation of Fiume, hundreds of mostly non-Italians were arrested, including many leaders of the Slavic community, and thousands of Slavs started to flee the city, with additional anti-Slav violence during the 1922 Fascist coup,.

In a 1920 speech in Pola (Istria), Benito Mussolini proclaimed an expansionist policy, based on the fascist concept of spazio vitale, similar to the Nazi lebensraum policy: 

With Fascist Italy’s imperialistic policy of spanning the Mediterranean, Italy in 1927 signed an agreement with the Croatian fascist, terrorist Ustaše organization, under which contingent on their seizing power, the Ustaše agreed to cede to Italy additional territory in Dalmatia and the Bay of Kotor, while also renouncing all Croatian claims to Istria, Fiume (Rijeka), Zadar and the Adriatic Islands, which Italy annexed after WWI. The Ustaše became a tool of Italy. They embarked on a terrorist campaign of placing bombs on international trains bound for Yugoslavia, and instigated an armed uprising in Lika, then part of Yugoslavia. In 1934 in Marseille, the Italy-supported Ustaše assassinated King Alexander I of Yugoslavia, while simultaneously killing the French Foreign Minister.

World War II

Seeking to create an Imperial Italy, Mussolini started expansionist wars in the Mediterranean, with Fascist Italy invading and occupying Albania in 1939, and in 1940 France, Greece, Egypt, and the Malta. In April 1941, Italy and its Nazi Germany ally, attacked Yugoslavia. They carved up Yugoslavia, with Italy occupying large portions of Slovenia, Croatia, Bosnia, Montenegro, Serbia and Macedonia, directly annexing to Italy Ljubljana Province, Gorski Kotar and Central Dalmatia, along with most Croatian islands, with the creation of the Governatorate of Dalmatia. Italy proceeded to Italianize the annexed areas of Dalmatia. Place names were Italianized, and Italian was made the official language in all schools, churches and government administration. All Croatian cultural societies were banned, while Italians took control of all key mineral, industrial and business establishments.

Italian policies prompted resistance by Dalmatians, many joined the Partisans. In response, the Italians adopted tactics of summary executions, internments, property confiscations, and the burning of villages." The Italian government sent tens of thousands of civilians, among them many women and children, to Italian concentration camps, such as Rab, Gonars, Monigo, Renicci, Molat, Zlarin, Mamula, etc. Altogether, some 80,000 Dalmatians, 12% of the population, passed through Italian concentration camps. Thousands died in the camps, including hundreds of children. Italian forces executed thousands of additional civilians as hostages and conducted massacres, such as the Podhum massacre in 1942. On their own, or with their Nazi and collaborationist allies, the Italian army undertook brutal anti-Partisan offensives, during which tens-of-thousands of Partisans were killed, along with many civilians, plus thousands more civilians executed or sent to concentration camps after the campaigns.

No Italians were ever brought to trial for war crimes committed in Yugoslavia or elsewhere. In 1944, near the end of a war in which Nazis, Fascists and their allies killed over 800,000 Yugoslavs, Croat poet Vladimir Nazor wrote: "We will wipe away from our territory the ruins of the destroyed enemy tower, and we will throw them in the deep sea of oblivion. In the place of a destroyed Zara, a new Zadar will be reborn, and this will be our revenge in the Adriatic" (Zara had been under Fascist rule for 22 years, and was in ruins because of heavy Allied bombing).

Investigations 

After the war, inspector Umberto de Giorgi, who was State Police marshal under fascist and Nazi rule, led the Foibe Exploration Team. Between 1945 and 1948 they investigated 71 foibe locations on the Italian side of the border. 23 of these were empty, in the rest they discovered some 464 corpses. These included soldiers killed during the last battles of the war. Among the 246 identified corpses, more than 200 were military (German, Italian, other), and some 40 were civilians, of the latter, 30 killed after the war.

Due to claims of hundreds having been killed and tossed into the Basovizza mineshaft, in August–October, 1945 British military authorities investigated the shaft, ultimately recovering 9 German soldiers, 1 civilian and a few horse cadavers. Based on these results the British suspended excavations. Afterwards the city of Trieste used the mineshaft as a garbage dump. Despite repeat demands from various right-wing groups to further excavate the shaft, the government of Trieste, led by the Christian Democratic mayor Gianni Bartoli, declined to do so, claiming among other reasons, lack of financial resources. In 1959 the shaft was sealed and a monument erected, thus becoming the center of the annual foibe commemorations.

Only a few trials were held, including that of the Trieste Zoll-Steffe criminal gang, for the killing of 18 people in the Plutone foibe in May 1945. Afterwards, Yugoslav authorities arrested the gang members and took them to Ljubljana, with two killed along the way while trying to escape, and the others convicted before a military tribunal. Additional members of the gang were brought before an Italian court in Trieste 1947, and were convicted and sentenced to prison for 2–3 years for their role in the Plutone killings.

In 1949 a trial was held in Trieste for those accused of killing Mario Fabian, a torturer in the "Collotti gang", a fascist squad that during the war killed and tortured Slovene and Italian antifascists, and Jews. Fabian was taken from his home on May 4, 1945, then shot and tossed into the Basovizza shaft. He is the only known Italian victim of Basovizza. His executioners were at first condemned, but later acquitted. The historian Pirjevec notes that the head of the gang, Gaetano Collotti, was awarded a medal by the Italian government in 1954, for fighting Slovene partisans in 1943, despite the fact that Collotti and his gang had committed many crimes while working for the Gestapo, and was killed by Italian partisans near Treviso in 1945.

In 1993 a study titled Pola Istria Fiume 1943-1945 by Gaetano La Perna provided a detailed list of the victims of Yugoslav occupation (in September–October 1943 and from 1944 to the very end of the Italian presence in its former provinces) in the area. La Perna gave a list of 6,335 names (2,493 military, 3,842 civilians). The author considered this list "not complete".

A 2002 joint report by Rome's Society of Fiuman studies (Società di Studi Fiumani) and Zagreb's Croatian Institute of History (Hrvatski institut za povijest) concluded that from Fiume and the surrounding area "no less than 500 persons of Italian nationality lost their lives between 3 May 1945 and 31 December 1947. To these we should add an unknown number of 'missing' (not less than a hundred) relegated into anonymity due to missing inventory in the Municipal Registries together with the relevant number of victims having ... Croatian nationality (who were often, at least between 1940 and 1943, Italian citizens) determined after the end of war by the Yugoslav communist regime."

In March 2006, the border municipality of Nova Gorica in Slovenia released a list of names of 1,048 citizens of the Italian city of Gorizia (the two cities belonged until the Treaty of Paris of 1947 to the same administrative body) who disappeared in May 1945 after being arrested by the Partisan 9th Corps. According to the Slovene government, "the list contains the names of persons arrested in May 1945 and whose destiny cannot be determined with certainty or whose death cannot be confirmed".

Alleged motives

It has been alleged that the killings were part of a purge aimed at eliminating potential enemies of communist Yugoslav rule, which would have included members of German and Italian fascist units, Italian officers and civil servants, parts of the Italian elite who opposed both communism and fascism (including the leadership of Italian anti-fascist partisan organizations and the leaders of Fiume's Autonomist Party, including Mario Blasich and Nevio Skull), Slovenian and Croatian anti-communists, collaborators, and radical nationalists.

Another reason for the killings was retribution for the years of Italian repression, forced Italianization, suppression of Slavic sentiments and killings performed by Italian authorities during the war, not just in the concentration camps (such as Rab and Gonars), but also in reprisals often undertaken by the fascists.

Pamela Ballinger in her book, History in Exile: Memory and Identity at the Borders of the Balkans, wrote:

The report by the mixed Italian-Slovenian commission describes the circumstances of the 1945 killings as follows:

Post-War
The foibe have been a neglected subject in mainstream political debate in Italy, Yugoslavia and former-Yugoslav nations, only recently garnering attention with the publication of several books and historical studies. It is thought that after World War II, while Yugoslav politicians rejected any alleged crime, Italian politicians wanted to direct the country's attention toward the future and away from the idea that Italy was, in fact, a defeated nation.

So, the Italian government tactically "exchanged" the impunity of the Italians accused by Yugoslavia for the renunciation to investigate the foibe massacres. Italy never extradited or prosecuted some 1,200 Italian Army officers, government officials or former Fascist Party members accused of war crimes by Yugoslavia, Ethiopia, Greece and other occupied countries and remitted to the United Nations War Crimes Commission. On the other hand, Belgrade didn't insist overmuch on requesting the prosecution of alleged Italian war criminals.

Re-emergence of the issue

For several Italian historians these killings were the beginning of organized ethnic cleansing. Silvio Berlusconi's coalition government brought the issue back into open discussion. The Italian Parliament (with the support of the vast majority of the represented parties) made February 10 National Memorial Day of the Exiles and Foibe, first celebrated in 2005 with exhibitions and observances throughout Italy (especially in Trieste). The occasion is held in memory of innocents killed and forced to leave their homes, with little support from their home country. In Carlo Azeglio Ciampi's words: "Time has come for thoughtful remembrance to take the place of bitter resentment." Moreover, for the first time, leaders from the Italian left, such as Walter Veltroni, visited the Basovizza foiba and admitted the culpability of the Left in covering up the subject for decades.

Nowadays, a large part of the Italian left acknowledges the nature of the foibe massacres, as attested by some declarations of Luigi Malabarba, senator for the Communist Refoundation Party, during the parliamentary debate on the institution of the National Memorial Day:

Italian president Giorgio Napolitano took an official speech during celebration of the "Memorial Day of Foibe Massacres and Istrian-Dalmatian exodus" in which he stated:

The Croatian President Stipe Mesić immediately responded in writing, stating that:

The incident was resolved in a few days after diplomatic contacts between the two presidents at the Italian foreign ministry. On February 14, the Office of the President of Croatia issued a press statement:

In Italy, Law 92 of 30 March 2004 declared February 10 as a Day of Remembrance dedicated to the memory of the victims of Foibe and the Istrian-Dalmatian exodus. The same law created a special medal to be awarded to relatives of the victims:
 Medal of Day of Remembrance  to relatives of victims of foibe killings

In February 2012, a photo of Italian troops killing Slovene civilians was shown on public Italian TV as if being the other way round. When historian Alessandra Kersevan, who was a guest, pointed out to the television host Bruno Vespa that the photo depicted the killings of some Slovenes rather than Italians, the host did not apologize. A diplomatic protest followed.

In the media
 Il Cuore nel Pozzo, a 2005 TV movie focusing on the escape of a group of children from Tito's partisans.
 , a 2018 film directed by Maximiliano Hernando Bruno and starring Geraldine Chaplin, Sandra Ceccarelli, and Franco Nero.
 Warlight, a book by Michael Ondaatje. 

Note: Many books have been written about the foibe, and results, interpretations and estimates of victims can in some cases vary largely according to the point of view of the author. Since most of the foibe currently lie outside Italian territory, no formal and complete investigation could be carried out during the years of the Cold war, and books could be of a speculative or anecdotal nature.

See also 
 Istrian-Dalmatian exodus
 National Memorial Day of the Exiles and Foibe
 World War II in Yugoslavia
 List of mass executions and massacres in Yugoslavia during World War II
 Carso
 Norma Cossetto
 Francesco Bonifacio
 Mass killings under communist regimes

Notes and references

Notes

References

Bibliography 
 
 
 
 
 
 
 
 English edition: 
 
 
 
 
 
 
 

  Pamela Ballinger, History in Exile: Memory and Identity at the Borders of the Balkans, Princeton University Press, 2002, .
  Benjamin David Lieberman, Terrible Fate: Ethnic Cleansing in the Making of Modern Europe, Ivan R. Dee, 2006 - Original from the University of Michigan 9 Jun 2008, .
  Glenda Sluga, The Problem of Trieste and the Italo-Yugoslav Border: Difference, Identity, and Sovereignty in Twentieth-century Europe, SUNY Press, 2001 .
  Joze Pirjevec, Foibe: una storia d'Italia, Turin: Giulio Einaudi Editore, 2009, .
  Gianni Bartoli, Il martirologio delle genti adriatiche
  Claudia Cernigoi, Operazione Foibe—Tra storia e mito, Kappa Vu, Udine, 2005, .  (The first edition of the book, published in 1997 as Operazione foibe a Trieste and limited in scope to the Trieste territory, is available online)
  Vincenzo Maria De Luca, Foibe. Una tragedia annunciata. Il lungo addio italiano alla Venezia Giulia, Settimo sigillo, Roma, 2000.
  Luigi Papo, L'Istria e le sue foibe, Settimo sigillo, Roma, 1999.
  Luigi Papo, L'ultima bandiera.
  Marco Pirina, Dalle foibe all'esodo 1943-1956.
  Franco Razzi, Lager e foibe in Slovenia.
  Giorgio Rustia, Contro operazione foibe a Trieste, 2000.
  Carlo Sgorlon, La foiba grande, Mondadori, 2005, .
  Pol Vice, La foiba dei miracoli, Kappa Vu, Udine, 2008.
  Atti del convegno di Sesto San Giovanni 2008, "Foibe. Revisionismo di Stato e amnesie della Repubblica", Kappa Vu, Udine, 2008.
  Gaetano La Perna, Pola Istria Fiume 1943-1945, Mursia, Milan, 1993.
  Marco Girardo Sopravvissuti e dimenticati: il dramma delle foibe e l'esodo dei giuliano-dalmati Paoline, 2006.
  Amleto Ballerini, Mihael Sobolevski, Le vittime di nazionalità italiana a Fiume e dintorni (1939–1947) - Žrtve talijanske nacionalnosti u Rijeci i okolici (1939.-1947.), Società Di Studi Fiumani - Hrvatski Institut Za Povijest, Roma Zagreb, Ministero per i beni e le attività culturali Direzione generale per gli archivi, Pubblicazioni degli Archivi Di Stato, Sussidi 12, .
 An Italian-Croatian joint research carried out by the Italian "Society of Fiuman studies" and the "Croatian Institute of History", containing an alphabetic list of recognized victims. As foot note, on each of the two lingual forewords, a warning states that Società di Studi Fiumani do not judge completed the present work, because the lack of funds, could not achieve to the finalization that was in intentions and goals of the initial project.

Further reading 
 Pamela Ballinger, History in Exile: Memory and Identity at the Borders of the Balkans, princeton.edu; accessed 14 December 2015.
 "In Trieste, Investigation of Brutal Era Is Blocked", nytimes.com, 20 April 1997.

Report of the Italian-Slovene commission of historians (in three languages):
 Slovene-Italian Relations 1880-1956 Report 2000 
 Relazioni Italo-Slovene 1880-1956 Relazione 2000  
 Slovensko-italijanski odnosi 1880-1956 Poročilo 2000

External links 
 Claudia Cernigoi, Operazione foibe a Trieste by Claudia Cernigoi 
 Le foibe 
 Gian Luigi Falabrino, Il punto sulle foibe e sulle deportazioni nelle regioni orientali (1943-45) 
 Marco Ottanelli, "The truth about the foibe" 
 Istituto regionale per la storia della Resistenza e dell’Età contemporanea nel Friuli Venezia Giulia, "Vademecum per il giorno del ricordo" 

Videos
 1948 Italian newsreel

Massacres in 1943
Massacres in 1945
Massacres in Italy
Massacres in Yugoslavia
Yugoslav war crimes
Deaths by firearm in Italy
Deaths by firearm in Yugoslavia
World War II massacres
Ethnic cleansing in Europe
Yugoslavia in World War II
1943 in Yugoslavia
1945 in Yugoslavia
Italians of Croatia
Political and cultural purges
Political repression in Communist Yugoslavia
Politicides
Anti-Italian sentiment
Aftermath of World War II in Yugoslavia
Mass murder in 1943
1943 murders in Europe
Mass murder in 1945
1945 murders in Europe
Massacres of Croats